Kaloko can refer to a location in Hawaii, United States:

 Kaloko, Hawaii, a census-designated place on the island of Hawaii
 Kaloko-Honokōhau National Historical Park, on the island of Hawaii
 Ka Loko Reservoir, on Kauai

See also
 Kalokol, a town on Lake Turkana, Kenya